A heat dome is caused when atmosphere traps hot ocean air, as if bounded by a lid or cap. The upper air weather patterns are slow to move, referred to by meteorologists as an Omega block.

Creation of heat domes

In still, dry summer conditions, a mass of warm air builds up. The high pressure from the Earth's atmosphere pushes the warm air down. The air is compressed, and as its net heat is now in a smaller volume, so it must get hotter. As the warm air attempts to rise, the high pressure above it forces it down, to get hotter, and its pressure grows higher.

The high pressure acts as a dome, causing everything below it to get hotter and hotter. The term is often extrapolated in the media terminology for any heat wave situation. The term heat dome is also used in the context of urban heat islands.

Examples
In chronological order,

 2012 North American heat wave
 2018 North American heat wave
 2019 Alaska heat wave 
 2021 Russia heatwave
 2021 British Columbia wildfires
 2021 Western North America heat wave

See also
 Heat wave

References

External links and references

 What is a Heat Dome?—Scientific American
 BBC reference
 sky.com reference
 telegraph.co.uk reference
 severe-weather.eu/ on heat domes
 YouTube reference

Atmospheric dynamics
Meteorological phenomena